Feigeria is a genus of moths of the family Erebidae. The genus was erected by Emilio Berio in 1990.

Species
Feigeria alauda (Guenée, 1852) Brazil (Amazonas), Chile
Feigeria arpi (Prout, 1921) Brazil (Rio Grande do Sul)
Feigeria buteo (Guenée, 1852) Venezuela, Brazil (Rio de Janeiro)
Feigeria caligula (Maassen, 1890) Ecuador
Feigeria claricostata (Dognin, 1912) Colombia, Peru
Feigeria dichroa (Hampson, 1926) Venezuela
Feigeria feigei Berio, [1991]
Feigeria hercyna (Drury, 1775) Jamaica
Feigeria herilia (Stoll, [1780]) Suriname, Colombia
Feigeria letiformis (Guenée, 1852) Brazil (Rio de Janeiro), Cayenne
Feigeria lignitis (Hampson, 1926) Venezuela
Feigeria maculicollis (Walker, 1858) Venezuela
Feigeria magna (Gmelin, [1790]) Panama, Venezuela, Suriname
Feigeria melba (Felder & Rogenhofer, 1874) Brazil (Amazonas), Peru, Suriname
Feigeria mineis (Geyer, [1827]) Brazil (Rio de Janeiro)
Feigeria mycerina (Cramer, [1777]) Suriname, Haiti
Feigeria nero (Feige, 1975) Venezuela
Feigeria orcynia (Druce, 1890) Mexico, Panama
Feigeria pinasi Zilli, 2003 Ecuador
Feigeria scops (Guenée, 1852) Uruguay
Feigeria scopsoides Berio, [1991]
Feigeria tiasa (Druce, 1890) Costa Rica
Feigeria vultura (Druce, 1890) British Honduras, Guatemala, Panama
Feigeria xylia (Guenée, 1852) Mexico, Suriname
Feigeria xylina Berio, [1991]

References

Noctuidae